Bishop of Busan may refer to:

The bishop of the Anglican Diocese of Busan, South Korea
The bishop of the Roman Catholic Diocese of Busan, South Korea

Note: despite the differences of spelling above, Busan and Pusan are different variants of spelling of the same city in South Korea.